Preparation and attempt are related, but different standards in criminal law.

An attempt to commit an unconsummated crime is viewed as having the same gravity as if the crime had occurred. But preparation that falls short of an actual attempt is not, although it may be punishable in some other way.

Courts have not been able to draw a clear bright line as to when acts committed in preparation for a crime are actually an attempt to commit the crime.

Some approaches, summarized in the case of United States v. Mandujano, include the physical proximity doctrine, the dangerous proximity doctrine, the indispensable element test, the probable desistance test, the abnormal step approach, and the uneqivocality test.

The Model Penal Code approach requires a substantial step, in addition to having a criminal purpose.

References

Legal doctrines and principles
Legal terminology